The Zenith Gemini CH 620 is a twin engine, two seat, light aircraft, designed to be competitive in the single engine market.  The Canadian designed Gemini flew in 1996 but kit production has not been started.

Design and development

The compact Gemini is a Chris Heintz (of Zenair Co., Canada) designed twin engined two seater with a wingspan only 3 in (76 mm) greater than that of the Zenith Zodiac, with which it shares many components.  Its square tipped low wings are built around a single spar and, like the rest of the Gemini, are stressed aluminium skinned.  Most of the taper is on the trailing edges, which carry mass balanced ailerons over almost all the span outboard of the engines.  The two Jabiru 2200 flat four engines are mounted in front of the leading edge, under long over-wing cowlings; the starboard engine is toed-out by 2.5°.  The tailplane is rectangular in plan, the separate, mass balanced elevators having a cut-out for the movement of a tall, tapered, all-moving rudder.  The port elevator carries a trim tab.

The Gemini's semi-monocoque fuselage is flat sided, though rounded decking merges from behind into a smooth single piece canopy over the cabin, where two sit side-by side.  The prototype has a tailwheel undercarriage, though later aircraft could have tricycle gear.  The tailwheel is fixed but the mainwheels retract backwards into the engine nacelles, leaving the wheels slightly protruding in case of a wheels-up landing.

The Gemini first flew on 23 July 1996.  Since then the development pace has been slow, with the company's focus elsewhere.  There has been discussion of a revised airfoil section and uprated Jabiru engines. As of 2000, there was no indication of a date set for kit production.

Specifications

References

External links

1990s Canadian sport aircraft
Gemini
Gemini
Low-wing aircraft
Aircraft first flown in 1996
Twin piston-engined tractor aircraft